"BAPS" (a backronym for Bad Ass Pretty Sagittarius) is a song by American rapper Trina and Trinidadian rapper Nicki Minaj, released as a single from Trina's sixth studio album, The One (2019).

Background
BAPS is a song from Trina's sixth studio album, The One (2019). It was released on June 19, 2019, as a surprise release two days before Trina's full album came out. The song marks the fourth time Trina and Minaj have collaborated on a track. It was released for digital download and streaming in June 2019.

Trina discussed its release on the thirteenth episode of Queen Radio and asked Minaj to film a music video with her because they were originally supposed to, but The Nicki Wrld Tour got in the way.

Music and lyrics 
"BAPS" was co-written by Trina, Nicki Minaj, Birdman, B.G. (Baby Gangsta), Mannie Fresh, Juvenile and Lil Wayne with additional production by Audio Jones and co-production by Trina herself. Lyrically, the song samples "Project Bitch" by Cash Money Millionaires.

"BAPS" is a backronym for "Bad Ass Pretty Sagittarius". The lyrics of the song reference famous people previously associated with Trina such as French Montana, Tory Lanez, and James Harden.

Controversy
The song become the subject of a public dispute when Reginald Saunders, the head of A&R at Trina's record label Rockstarr Music Group, released a statement regarding Minaj. In a post on his Instagram account, he accused Minaj of being uncooperative and called her a "deceiver and manipulator".

The post also referenced there being no music video produced to promote the record. Two days later, Trina filmed a video discussing the alleged problems. She defended Minaj and blamed herself for the lack of visual for the project. She explained: "I had a 45-minute conversation on the phone with Nicki Minaj about business, about my record, about my song, about everything, It's not about a video, it's bigger than a video. The video is just a portion of what's happening. This is more about making sure the business is right."

Critical reception
The song received positive reviews from music critics. A Rap-Up reporter stated that "it's the Barbie and Da Baddest" and called the track a "boss bitch anthem". Rania Aniftos from Billboard said "Trina and Nicki Minaj have no time for unworthy men in their newest girl gang anthem." They also branded it a "boss gal anthem". Madeleine Marr from the Miami Herald said that the pair "have created a thing of beauty" in recording "BAPS". She noted "The piano-heavy tune references various fellow celebrities from her [Trina's] dating past." A journalist from Vibe said that Trina "enlisted one of the boldest voices in the game" for "BAPS".

Hannah Frishberg of the New York Post said that the song appeared to pay homage to the 1997 film B.A.P.S. She noted that both the film's promotional poster and Trina's single artwork both feature a crown motif above the wording of "BAPS". She added that the background music sounded like "a Pac-Man-like dot-crunching background beat."

Charts

Release history

References 

2019 singles
2019 songs
Trina songs
Nicki Minaj songs
Songs written by Nicki Minaj
Songs written by Trina
Songs written by Birdman (rapper)
Songs written by Juvenile (rapper)
Songs written by Mannie Fresh
Songs written by Lil Wayne